Rose Ann Gonzales is a Filipina award-winning former child actress. She was popularly active in the 1980s along with other child stars of the era like Bamba, Lady Lee, RR Herrera, Chuckie Dreyfus, Jaypee de Guzman, Glaiza Herradura, Matet de Leon and Aiza Seguerra.

Career
Gonzales won the 1985 FAMAS Award for Best Child Actress in the film Kriminal and the 1987 Film Academy of the Philippines Award for Best Child Performer in the film Lumuhod Ka sa Lupa! She starred alongside Rudy Fernandez in both films.

Gonzales appeared in several movies such as Kriminal (1984); Muntinlupa (1984) with Anthony Alonzo and Marianne dela Riva; God Save Me! (1985) with Christopher de Leon; Send in the Clowns (1986) with Tito Sotto, Vic Sotto and Joey de Leon; Lumuhod Ka Sa Lupa! (1986); Pepe Saclao (1986) with Ramon Revilla; Family Tree (1987) with Nida Blanca and Luis Gonzales; Mga Anak ni Facifica Falayfay (1987) starring Dolphy; Binibining Tsuper-Man (1987) with Roderick Paulate; and Fly Me To The Moon (1988) with Tito Sotto, Vic Sotto and Joey de Leon, among others.

Awards and nominations

Filmography

Film
Kriminal (1984)
Muntinlupa (1984)
Public Enemy No. 2: Maraming Number Two (1985)
Baun Gang (1985)
The Sangley Point Robbery (1985)
God Save Me! (1985)
Send in the Clowns (1986)
Lumuhod Ka sa Lupa! (1986)
Pepe Saclao: Public Enemy No. 1 (1986)
Captain Barbell (1986)
Family Tree (1987)
Kapitan Pablo: Cavite Killing Fields (1987)
Bloody Mary, The Movie (1987)
Mga Anak ni Facifica Falayfay (1987)
Ako si Kiko, Ako si Kikay (1987)
Binibining Tsuper-Man (1987)
Black Magic (1987)
Kumander Gringa (1987)
Fly Me to the Moon (1988)
Nasaan Ka Inay? (1988)
Lost Command (1988)
Love Letters (1988)
Lorenzo Ruiz: The Saint... A Filipino (1988)
Langit at Lupa (1988)
Pepeng Kuryente: Man with a Thousand Volts (1988)
Moises Platon (1989)
Everlasting Love (1989)
Jones Bridge Massacre (Task Force Clabio) (1989)

Television
That's Entertainment (1993/1996)

References

External links
 

Living people
Filipino film actresses
Filipino child actresses
That's Entertainment (Philippine TV series)
That's Entertainment Thursday Group Members
Year of birth uncertain
Year of birth missing (living people)